Gascon may refer to:

 Gascony, an area of southwest France
 Gascon language
 Gascon cattle
 Gascon pig
 Gascon (grape), another name for the French wine grape Mondeuse noire

People
Elvira Gascón (1911–2000), Spanish painter and engraver
Gabriel Gascon, Canadian actor
George Gascón (born 1954), American police officer, District Attorney of San Francisco
Gilles Gascon, Canadian cinematographer
Jean Gascon (1920–1988), Canadian opera director, actor, and administrator
José Ángel Gascón (born 1985), Spanish footballer
Miguel Sebastián Gascón (born 1957), Spanish politician and economist
Sarai Gascón Moreno (born 1992), Spanish swimmer

See also
 Gascon campaign (disambiguation)
 Gascon Saintongeois, a breed of dog
 
 Gascony (disambiguation)
 Gascogne (disambiguation)

Language and nationality disambiguation pages